James Halliday may refer to:

 James Halliday (Canadian politician) (1845–1921), represented Bruce North in the Canadian House of Commons from 1901 to 1904
 James Halliday (weightlifter) (1918–2007), British weightlifter
 James Halliday (wine) (born 1938), Australian wine critic and writer
 Jimmy Halliday (1927–2013), leader of the Scottish National Party 1956–1960
 James Halliday, a deceased character in the novel, Ready Player One